Saraland High School (SHS), located in Saraland, Alabama, is a public high school operated by the Saraland City School System that educates grades 9–12.

The school's mascot is the spartan.

History

Saraland Schools was previously part of the Mobile County Public School System until 2006. Voters approved a plan to break away from the county system and form the Saraland City Schools system.

Athletics

Saraland High School competes in Class 6A of AHSAA.

During the 2022 football season, the Spartans saw major success in their football program, winning their first 6A football title in program history. The team had made the title game twice before, but lost to Clay-Chalkville and Pinson Valley, respectively. During the 2022 title game, Saraland beat Mountain Brook High School, 17-38.

Notable alumni
Cordale Flott, NFL cornerback for the New York Giants
Matt Peacock, MLB pitcher for the Kansas City Royals
Velus Jones Jr, NFL wide receiver/return specialist for the Chicago Bears

References

Public high schools in Alabama
High schools in Mobile County, Alabama
2010 establishments in Alabama
Educational institutions established in 2010